Martin Shamoonpour is an autodidactic multi-instrumentalist, composer, actor, and visual artist from Tehran. He was born in 1984 in an Assyrian family. One of the most important works of Martin Shamoonpour in the field of music is the publication of sermon on the mount, Tehransaranieh, 8 Bit and Ear Magazines. He has also worked as a composer and sound designer in more than thirty theater performances. Acting in films such as Dying in September, Melbourne, Bending The Rules and the sound of slow. In addition to being an actor, Martin Shamoonpour is also a composer in cinema and television. The most important works of Martin Shamoonpour as a composer are The Rule of Accident, the TV series Salam Taxi and the first season of the TV series Khandvane.

Excerpts from theatrical music 

 Les Justes, Director: Amir Hossein Hariri, February 2005
 Sowdadokht, Director: Talieh Tarighi, Fall 2007
 An Out of Tune symphony, Director: Atila Pesyani, December 2007
 Rashōmon, Director: Kobra Dabiri, April 2008
 My dear father, director: Mohammad Hassan Madjooni, summer 2008
 Where were you on January 8th? Director: Amir Reza Koohestani, December 2009
 In a Grove, Director: Javad Namaki, Fajr Theater Festival 1389
 Woman from the Past, Director: Mohammad Aghebati, August and September 2011
 Tehran, Director: Mahan Charmshir, June 2012
 Avaye Gel, Director: Yaser Khaseb, August and September 2012
 Dechlorination, Director: Mehdi Koushki, September and October 2012
 Silence Dolls, Director: Samaneh Zandinejad, Fajr Theater Festival 2013

Acting 

 The play by Dr. Shakil and Mr High, Writer: Martin Shamoonpour, Director: Pantea Bahram, Entezami Theater, 2012
 Bending The Rules, Director: Behnam Behzadi, 2013
 Mother Courage, The Man Outside, writer and director: Sajad Afsharian, Hafez Hall 2013
 Dying in September, Director: Hatef Alimardani , 2013
 Melbourne, Director: Nima Javidi, 2013
 Slow Sound, Director: Afshin Hashemi, 2014
The Jungle, Director:  Stephen Daldry, St. Ann’s Warehouse December 2018

Resources 

Iranian composers
1984 births
Living people